State Trunk Highway 33 (often called Highway 33, STH-33 or WIS 33) is a Wisconsin state highway running east–west across central Wisconsin.

Route description

La Crosse to Baraboo
Traveling east, it intersects with WIS 35. Leaving La Crosse, WIS 33 meanders eastward. It runs concurrently with WIS 162 from Newberg Corners to Middle Ridge. Further east, WIS 33 intersects WIS 27 in Cashton. Then, it briefly runs concurrently with WIS 131 in Ontario, then briefly meanders south through the Wildcat Mountain State Park, and then meanders back east. Even further east, WIS 33 runs concurrently with WIS 82 west of Hillsboro and then WIS 80 in Hillsboro. Both routes branch off together north from WIS 33 in Union Center. In La Valle, WIS 58 briefly runs concurrently with WIS 33. In Reedsburg, WIS 23 begins to travel east via WIS 33. Just east of Reedsburg, WIS 136 intersects and ends at a concurrency. Further east, WIS 23 branches off from WIS 33. Just north of West Baraboo, WIS 33 joins US 12 southward at a dumbbell interchange. In West Baraboo, WIS 33 leaves US 12 at another dumbbell interchange and briefly runs concurrently with WIS 136. As WIS 136 leaves southward at a four-way intersection, Business US 12 joins in from the north. In Baraboo, Bus. US 12 branches off southward where WIS 113 ends.

Baraboo to Port Washington
As WIS 33 continues eastward, it then meets I-90/I-94 at a parclo north of the Cascade Mountain ski resort. Another parclo is present just east of I-90/I-94. This time, it meets I-39. For a brief distance, WIS 33 turns north. As soon as it crosses the Wisconsin River, it then turns back east. As it enters downtown Portage, it meets US 51 at a one-way pair and WIS 16 at the western part of the one-way pair. North of Pardeeville, WIS 33 meets WIS 22. Further east, it then briefly runs concurrently with WIS 44 in Marcellon. Even further east, it then meets WIS 146 north of Cambria, WIS 73 north of Randolph, and WIS 68 in Fox Lake. As it intersects at an intersection where WIS 68 ends, WIS 33 turns south. In Beaver Dam, WIS 33 turns east, briefly following Business US 151. It then meets US 151 at a diamond interchange. At Minnesota Junction, WIS 33 intersects WIS 26. Continuing east, it intersects WIS 28 in Horicon, WIS 67 north of Neda, WIS 175 in Addison, and I-41/US 41 at a diamond interchange in Allenton. Between Nabob and West Bend, WIS 144 follows WIS 33. While they run concurrently with each other, they meet US 45 at another diamond interchange. In Saukville, WIS 33 meets I-43/WIS 57 at a diamond interchange once again.

History
Prior to European settlement, the foot trail from Port Washington to Horicon was the most traveled of seven trails that met in Horicon Marsh. A road was constructed to provide access from Lake Michigan to the fertile hunting grounds of the marsh, to provide food for the crews of ships on the lake.

Starting in 1918, WIS 33 used to travel from WIS 12 in Baraboo to Camp Douglas via parts of present-day WIS 136, WIS 33, the WIS 80/WIS 82 concurrency, WIS 80 alone, and CTH-H. In 1919, WIS 33 had undergone changes. As of 1919, it switched its service from Camp Douglas to La Crosse. The portion of the route from Union Center to Camp Douglas became WIS 94. Also, it extended eastward from Baraboo to Waupun via present-day WIS 33 and WIS 68. In 1929, WIS 33 (which served Waupun) and WIS 68 (which served Port Washington) swapped routes.

Major intersections

See also

References

External links

033
Transportation in La Crosse County, Wisconsin
Transportation in Monroe County, Wisconsin
Transportation in Vernon County, Wisconsin
Transportation in Juneau County, Wisconsin
Transportation in Sauk County, Wisconsin
Transportation in Columbia County, Wisconsin
Transportation in Dodge County, Wisconsin
Transportation in Washington County, Wisconsin
Transportation in Ozaukee County, Wisconsin